Neosho High School, also known as Neosho Intermediate School, is a historic high school building located at Neosho, Newton County, Missouri. It was built in 1916–17, and is a two-story, "U"-shaped, brick and stone trimmed building with Gothic Revival and Classical Revival style design elements.  The building measures approximately 101 feet by 127 feet.  Also on the property is the contributing two-story giraffe rock ancillary building, built as a vocational facility for the school in 1940.

It was listed on the National Register of Historic Places in 2002.

Notable alumni
 James Bishop
 Jacqueline Scott

References

School buildings on the National Register of Historic Places in Missouri
Gothic Revival architecture in Missouri
Neoclassical architecture in Missouri
School buildings completed in 1917
Schools in Newton County, Missouri
National Register of Historic Places in Newton County, Missouri
1917 establishments in Missouri
Neosho High School